Capital City Records is a Canadian online record label, owned and operated by the Edmonton Public Library. The label licenses and distributes locally-released music from Edmonton, Alberta. As of 2018, more than 150 Edmontonian releases have been released on Capital City Records.

History 
In 2015, the Edmonton Public Library unveiled its plan for Capital City Records and announced a call for submissions. The library stated that the label would serve as "digital platform for streaming and downloading Edmonton's local music and recording our music history." As a virtual record label owned by a public library, Capital City Records was the first of its kind in Canada. Capital City Records was modeled after similar music services in Iowa City, Iowa and Madison, Wisconsin.

In 2017, Capital City Records began showcasing its artist roster with live performances in Edmonton.

Artists 

 Baby Jey
 Ben Sures
 Coleen Brown
 Jay Sparrow
 Nuela Charles
 The Provincial Archive
 Shout Out Out Out Out
 Souljah Fyah
 The Velveteins

See also 

 Music of Alberta
 :Category: Music of Edmonton

References

External links 
 – official site

Canadian independent record labels
Music of Edmonton
Library publishing